Trypanosome may refer to:

Trypanosomatida, a biological order within Kinetoplastida
Trypanosoma, a genus within Trypanosomatida whose members are often referred to as trypanosomes
Trypanosoma brucei, a major human pathogen that causes sleeping sickness
Trypanosoma cruzi, a major human pathogen that causes Chagas disease
A morphological class of trypanosomatid with a flagellum laterally attached to the cell body